Michael J. Davern (23 July 1900 – 25 July 1973) was an Irish Fianna Fáil politician who served as Teachta Dála (TD) for the Tipperary South constituency from 1948 to 1965.

He was born 23 July 1900 in Ballymore, Cashel, County Tipperary, son of Owen Davern, a shopkeeper, who was a member for many years of South Tipperary County Council, and Johanna Davern (née Ryan). After attending national school locally, aged 17 Michael Davern joined the Irish Volunteers along with his brother Patrick. He was arrested for possession of gelignite, he was imprisoned in Cork Prison and Mountjoy Prison, Dublin, where he went on a 21 day hunger strike. He served in the Irish War of Independence with the 3rd Tipperary brigade of the IRA, attaining the rank of Staff captain. He suffered wounds during an engagement with Black and Tans at Ballagh, County Tipperary. Despite anti-Treaty sympathies, he took no active part in the Irish Civil War.

He was elected to Dáil Éireann at the 1948 general election. He was re-elected at the 1951, 1954, 1957 and 1961 general elections.

Davern did not contest the 1965 general election and was succeeded by his son Don Davern. After Don's death in 1968, another son Noel Davern was elected for Tipperary South at the 1969 general election.

For many years he operated a family-owned licensed business, Davern's Bar, on Main Street, Cashel. He died 25 July 1973 in Cashel, and was buried with military honours in St Cormac's cemetery.

See also
Families in the Oireachtas

References

1900 births
1973 deaths
Fianna Fáil TDs
Members of the 13th Dáil
Members of the 14th Dáil
Members of the 15th Dáil
Members of the 16th Dáil
Members of the 17th Dáil
Politicians from County Tipperary